M is a 1951 American film noir directed by Joseph Losey. It is a remake of Fritz Lang's 1931 German film of the same name about a child murderer. This version shifts the location of action from Berlin to Los Angeles and changes the killer's name from Hans Beckert to Martin W. Harrow. Both versions of M were produced by Seymour Nebenzal, whose son, Harold, was associate producer of the 1951 version.

The film was restored in 2015, with Harold Nebenzal as Executive Producer of the restoration.

Plot
Martin W. Harrow (David Wayne) is a compulsive child-murderer, and the public demands of the mayor and police that he be caught.  The police start a crackdown on criminal operations, dive bars and hangouts in the city, hoping that the murderer will turn up in one of the many raids.  This pressure is preventing the city's crime syndicate from doing business, and its boss, Marshall (Martin Gabel), organizes his forces to find and stop the murderer so that the police will stop the crackdown and Marshall can go back to business as usual.  Meanwhile, Police Inspector Carney (Howard Da Silva) has a psychiatrist examining patients who have been released from mental hospitals as possible suspects.

At the same time that the police focus on Harrow, finding incriminating evidence – the shoes of the dead children – in his apartment, the criminals track him down with his intended next victim. They capture him, and place him on trial by his "peers" in the  Los Angeles criminal underworld. Harrow makes an impassioned plea for his life, explaining that he is unable to stop himself from committing his unspeakable crimes.  Just as he is about to be killed by the crowd, the police arrive to take him away, but not before Marshall has shot and killed his alcoholic lawyer, Dan Langley (Luther Adler).

Cast

Cast notes:
M marked the screen debut of Martin Gabel, an original member of Orson Welles' Mercury Theatre troupe.

Production
Producer Seymour Nebenzel's Nero Films produced the original 1931 version of M directed by Fritz Lang, and Nebenzal retained the rights when he fled Nazi Germany and began to make films in Hollywood, primarily "B" pictures for major studios and low-budget independents. Nebenzal decided in 1950 to remake M, reset to Los Angeles – perhaps inspired by the anti-Communist mass hysteria then predominant in the country – and approached Lang about directing it, but Lang was appalled and outraged by the idea of anyone remaking a film he considered to be his masterpiece.  Nebenzal then approached another expatriate German film director, Douglas Sirk, who also turned him down.  Joseph Losey, however, took on the job, despite his being under suspicion of being a Communist by the FBI and the House Un-American Activities Committee. Losey's casting included actors who were also under suspicion.  Losey would later leave the U.S. and settle in the UK to make films there, notably his collaborations with writer Harold Pinter: The Servant (1963), Accident (1967) and The Go-Between (1971).

Robert Aldrich was Losey's assistant director on M.

Locations
The film was shot on location in downtown Los Angeles, including the now demolished Victorian neighborhood of Bunker Hill. David Wayne's character lived at an eccentric Victorian mansion on Bunker Hill Avenue known as the Max Heindel house because Heindel, a famous astrologer in the early 20th century, had once lived there. Some scenes were shot on and around the funicular Angels Flight on Third Street. The most spectacular footage occurs in a lengthy sequence shot inside the Bradbury Building on the southeast corner of Broadway and Third, a block east of Angels Flight. Losey used the basement, the distinctive stairways and balconies, and the roof of the building.

Reception
When the film was released, an anonymous reviewer at Variety wrote: "David Wayne, as the killer of small children, is effective and convincing. Luther Adler, as a drunken lawyer member of a gangster mob, turns in an outstanding performance, as do Martin Gabel, the gang-leader, and Howard da Silva and Steve Brodie as police officials ... Joseph Losey’s direction has captured the gruesome theme skilfully."  Wayne in particular received good reviews.

Fritz Lang remarked that the release of the 1951 film earned his 1931 original the best reviews of his career.

Censorship
M was boycotted in some cities because of director Losey's political views.

The film was classified by Ohio film censors as unacceptable for public screenings. At the end of 1953, the film's producers appealed to the U.S. Supreme Court, and in 1954, M was approved for exhibition in Ohio without any cuts.

See also
 List of American films of 1951

References

External links
 
 
 
 

1951 films
1951 crime drama films
1950s psychological thriller films
1950s serial killer films
American black-and-white films
American crime drama films
American psychological thriller films
American remakes of German films
American serial killer films
American vigilante films
Columbia Pictures films
1950s English-language films
Film noir
Films based on works by Thea von Harbou
Films directed by Joseph Losey
Films produced by Seymour Nebenzal
Films scored by Michel Michelet
Films set in Los Angeles
Films shot in Los Angeles
American police detective films
Procedural films
1950s American films